Hiroshi Suura (born August 19, 1925, Hiroshima, Japan – September 15, 1998) was a Japanese theoretical physicist, specializing in particle physics.

Education and career
Suura graduated in 1947 with a B.S. from the University of Tokyo and in 1954 with a Ph.D. in physics from Hiroshima University. From September 1955 to June 1956 he did research at the Institute for Advanced Study. From 1960 to 1965 he was a professor at Nihon University. From 1965 until his retirement as professor emeritus, he was a professor at the University of Minnesota.

In the theory of infrared corrections, Suura made important contributions, essential for many precise measurements involving elementary particles, especially electrons.

He was elected in 1967 a Fellow of the American Physical Society. On June 1, 1994, the University of Minnesota held a colloquium in honor of Hiroshi Suura. After his death, the Physical Society of Japan published a collection of articles as a memorial to him.

Selected publications
 
 
 
 
  (over 1900 citations)

References

1925 births
1998 deaths
20th-century Japanese physicists
Particle physicists
University of Tokyo alumni
Hiroshima University alumni
Academic staff of Nihon University
University of Minnesota faculty
Fellows of the American Physical Society
People from Hiroshima